The Type 180 is an automobile straight-4 engine produced in the 1970s.  It was an OHC design.

1.6/1.8
These engines (1,639/1,812 cc) were used in the Chrysler 160/180, a car also sold under a multiplicity of other names.

Applications:
 Chrysler 160/Chrysler-Simca 1609/Talbot-Simca 1609 (1.6-litre)
 Chrysler 160GT, 180/Chrysler-Simca 1610 (1.8-litre)

2.0
The 1,981 cc Type 180 was most common.  It was used in various Chrysler Europe and Simca models.

Applications:
 Chrysler 2-litre/Chrysler-Simca 2-litre/Talbot-Simca 1610/Talbot 2-litre
 Chrysler Centura

2.2

A  version was also built.  It was first used in the Talbot Tagora. Bore was 91.7 mm (3.61 in) and stroke was 81.6 mm (3.21 in) making a very oversquare design. This engine is sometimes confused with the 2,165 cc Renault/Peugeot Douvrin engine, but the displacement of the Simca 180 2.2-litre was slightly less. Later, this engine was also turbocharged, for use in the Citroën BX4TC and Peugeot 505 Turbos as the block was stronger than the Peugeot engine.

Applications:
 Citroën BX 4TC
 Matra Murena 2.2
 Peugeot 505 Turbo
 Talbot Tagora GLS

180